A blockbuster bomb or cookie was one of several of the largest conventional bombs used in World War II by the Royal Air Force (RAF). The term blockbuster was originally a name coined by the press and referred to a bomb which had enough explosive power to destroy an entire street or large building through the effects of blast in conjunction with incendiary bombs.

Design

The bombs then called Blockbusters were the RAF's HC (high capacity) bombs. Most general-purpose bombs, termed "medium capacity'" (MC) by the RAF, contained 50% explosive by weight, the rest being made up of the fragmentation casing.

A T-section steel beam was welded to the inner surface of the bomb to strengthen it. Subsequent Mark II and Mark III HC bombs differed in detail; the conical nose was replaced with a domed nose and the number of fuzes was increased from one to three to guarantee detonation. The Mark IV bomb did not have the T-section beam and the Mark V and Mark VI bombs were versions manufactured in the United States.
 
The larger  bomb was constructed from two  sections, of a larger  diameter, that fitted together with bolts. A  version was created by adding a third 4000 lb section and should not be confused with the 12,000lb Tallboy ground-penetrating "earthquake" bomb.

The 4000-lb high-capacity design was little more than a cylinder full of explosives: it was unaerodynamic and did not have fins. By comparison the similar American "4,000 pound LC Bomb AN-M56" bomb was aerodynamically designed as other US bombs were, with a sheet metal tailfin assembly and shaped nose and aft sections. When fitted with a conical "nose piece" and a drum tail, the  British "Blockbuster"  bomb fell straight down. These bombs were designed for their blast effect, to cause damage to buildings, specifically to blow roof tiles off, so that the small  incendiary bombs could reach the building interiors. In contrast to the American AN-M56 ordnance, the cylindrical "HC"-class British-design high capacity bombs were used only by the RAF, which was the only air force with bombers with bomb bays large enough to hold them.

In 1947 Alfred Cecil Brooks of Stourbridge was appointed a Member of the Order of the British Empire, for creating the Blockbuster, although his citation was worded "outstanding services to the King of a nature that cannot be revealed". The local newspaper referred to him as "Blockbuster Brooks".

Operational use

The first type of aircraft to carry  bombs operationally was the Wellington during a strike on Emden in April 1941; carriage of the bomb required the bomb beam to be removed from the bomb bay and a slot cut in the bomb doors - the bomb protruded slightly through this and, on release, simply fell out through the hole. The bomb later became part of the standard bomb load of the RAF's heavy night bombers, as well as that of the Mosquitoes of the Light Night Strike Force, whose aircraft would sometimes bomb Berlin twice in one night, flown by two different crews.

The 2,000-lb HC was used until the end of the war; use peaked in 1944 with over 16,000 dropped

The  and the  could be carried only by the Avro Lancaster which needed to be slightly modified with bulged bomb-bay doors.

The first use of the  HC was by 15 Squadron Lancasters against Berlin on 2 December 1943. Bad weather and other factors meant their effectiveness was not noted.

The  "cookie" was regarded as a particularly dangerous load to carry. Due to the airflow over the detonating pistols fitted in the nose, it would often explode even if dropped in a supposedly "safe" unarmed state.

617 Squadron developed a technique of dropping a 1,000lb MC bomb just before a 12,000lb HC bomb; the shock wave from the 1,000lb explosion fired the pistols on the 12,000lb bomb to give an "air burst"; this technique was used successfully in attacks including the Michelin factory at Clermont-Ferrand in March 1944.

Post-war unexploded ordnance

An unusual dry period led to low river levels in the Rhine in December 2011, exposing a 4,000-lb HC bomb in the riverbed near Koblenz. A radius of  around the bomb site (containing about 45,000 people) was evacuated while the bomb was defused. Another unexploded blockbuster was found in Dortmund in November 2013, requiring the evacuation of more than 20,000 people from the area. 
Other bombs were found and defused in Vicenza on 29 April 2001 and 25 April 2014.

On 19 December 2016, a British bomb identified as a 4,000-lb HC "blockbuster" was discovered in Augsburg, Germany. It was defused on Christmas Day, requiring evacuation of more than 54,000 people within a radius of 1.5 km.

This was the largest evacuation in Germany since the Second World War.

On 8 April 2018, an HC 4000 bomb was discovered during gardening jobs in Paderborn, near the local university, leading to the evacuation of 26,400 people while the bomb was defused.

Bombs

2,000-lb HC
Design of a 2,000 lb to meet requirements of similar size to existing 1900-lb GP bomb was by Vickers with parachute arrangements by the RAF; this was at the same time Woolwich was designing the 4000lb bomb. Actual case construction was by Great Western Railway Company. Live tests began at start of 1941; a few were used operationally in late 1941 with parachute dropping and delay timer. The parachute requirement was dropped and from early 1942 they were used with conventional tail. Improved Mark II and Mark III (with different fuse positions) followed in 1943.

4,000-lb HC
 Mark I: first production design
 Mark II: three nose pistols
 Mark III: no side pistol pockets
 Mark IV: no stiffening beam
 Mark V: U.S. production
 Mark VI: U.S. production

Filling was Amatol, RDX/TNT, Minol, or Torpex.
In 1943, 25,000 of these were used; this rose to 38,000 in 1944. In 1945 up to the end of the war a further 25,000 were used.

8,000-lb HC
 Mk I
 Mk II
Actual weight  with charge to weight ratio of 68%. Filling was 'Amatex 9' or 'Torpex 2'. Bombs were produced from 1942 to 1945.

12,000-lb HC
 Mk I
 Mk II

Charge weight ratio of 80%. Filling was Amatex or Torpex. 170 were produced in the last two years of the war.

Other uses

Air mines

During The Blitz the Germans used naval mines dropped with parachutes as improvised blockbusters. Their fuse was triggered by the shock of landing, with the bomb exploding after a 17-second delay. As the bomb was not in a crater, the force of the blast would disperse laterally, causing extensive damage. The large raid on Coventry on 14–15 November 1940 included the use of 50 parachute mines, which caused extensive blast damage. The British called these devices air-mines, a calque of the German term Luftmine. These types were used also during air raids on Malta, especially on its harbour areas.

See also
  Tallboy bomb
  Grand Slam bomb
 Firebombing
 Firestorm
 SC 1800 Satan, the rough German equivalent of the American AN-M56 general purpose "blockbuster".
 BLU-82
 MOAB

References
 Citations

 Bibliography

External links

 A 12,000lb HC blockbuster pictured in the factory minus-tail unit
 A 12,000lb HC blockbuster being dropped
 An 8,000lb HC blockbuster about to be loaded aboard a Lancaster

World War II aerial bombs of the United Kingdom
Weapons and ammunition introduced in 1941